A Brief History of Seven Killings is the third novel by Jamaican author Marlon James. It was published in 2014 by Riverhead Books. The novel spans several decades and explores the attempted assassination of Bob Marley in Jamaica in 1976 and its aftermath, through the crack wars in New York City in the 1980s and a changed Jamaica in the 1990s.

Synopsis
The novel has five sections, each named after a musical track and covering the events of a single day:
“Original Rockers: December 2, 1976”
“Ambush in the Night: December 3, 1976”
“Shadow Dancin’: February 15, 1979”
“White Lines/Kids in America: August 14, 1985”
“Sound Boy Killing: March 22, 1991”

The first part of the novel is set in Kingston, Jamaica, in the build-up to the Smile Jamaica Concert held on 5 December 1976, and describes politically motivated violence between gangs associated with the Jamaica Labour Party (JLP) and the People's National Party (PNP), especially in the West Kingston neighbourhoods of Tivoli Gardens and Mathews Lane (renamed in the novel as Copenhagen City and Eight Lanes), including involvement of the CIA in the Jamaican politics of the time. As well as Marley (who is referred to as "the Singer" throughout), other real-life characters depicted or fictionalized in the book include Kingston gangsters Winston "Burry Boy" Blake and George "Feathermop" Spence, Claude Massop and Lester Lloyd Coke (Jim Brown) of the JLP and Aston Thomson (Buckie Marshall) of the PNP.

Reception
James' novel was widely praised for its mastery of voice and genre, encompassing historical epic, spy novel, gang thriller and mythical saga all at once. Writing in Literary Review, Kevin Power praises Marlon James' energy and imagination in his characters' voices: "his command of a range of tones and voices approaches the virtuoso." However, Power notes the novel's lack of narrative momentum necessary to propel it through nearly 700 pages.

Awards

The book was awarded the 2015 Booker Prize. This was the first time that a Jamaican-born author had won the prize. According to the BBC: "[Booker chair of judges Michael] Wood said the judges came to a unanimous decision in less than two hours. He praised the book's 'many voices'—it contains more than 75 characters—which 'went from Jamaican slang to Biblical heights'".

2014 – National Book Critics Circle Award finalist
2015 – Anisfield-Wolf Book Award for Fiction
2015 – Minnesota Book Award for Novel & Short Story
2015 – Fiction category of the OCM Bocas Prize for Caribbean Literature
2015 – Booker Prize

Television
HBO has optioned the novel and is planning a television series, although no debut date has been announced.

References

2014 novels
Novels by Marlon James
Booker Prize-winning works
Novels set in Jamaica
Cultural depictions of Bob Marley
Postmodern novels
Novels about organized crime
American Book Award-winning works
Riverhead Books books